Penion cuvierianus is a species of very large predatory sea snail or whelk, commonly called the flaring penion, a marine gastropod mollusc in the family Buccinidae, the true whelks.

Description
Penion cuvierianus is a very large species of siphon whelk. Shells vary between ivory and yellow in colouration.

Recent genetic and geometric morphometric research using shell shape and size has demonstrated that a formerly recognised subspecies Penion cuvierianus jeakingsi is closely related to Penion ormesi, instead of Penion curierianus, and the taxon has been synonymised with P. ormesi.

Distribution
Penion cuvierianus is endemic to New Zealand. The taxonomic name is a reference to the type locality of Cuvier Island. The species has an abundant fossil record in the North Island of New Zealand.

The species occurs in the subtidal zone between depths of 20 and 200 metres.

Subspecies
These subspecies have been recognised:
 Penion cuvierianus cuvierianus (Powell, 1927)

Subspecies brought into synonymy
 Penion cuvierianus jeakingsi (Powell, 1947): synonym of Penion ormesi (Powell, 1927)

References

External links

 Museum of New Zealand Te Papa Tongarewa, Taxon: Penion cuvierianus Powell, 1927 (Species)
 Auckland War Memorial Museum Penion cuvierianus cuvierianus
 Massey University NZ Fauna Scanned 3D model of Penion cuvierianus
 Natural History Museum Rotterdam - Mollusca - Gastropoda - Buccinidae

Buccinidae
Gastropods of New Zealand
Gastropods described in 1927
Taxa named by Arthur William Baden Powell